The 2003 FIBA European Championship, commonly called FIBA EuroBasket 2003, was the 33rd FIBA EuroBasket regional basketball championship held by FIBA Europe, which also served as the Europe qualifier for the 2004 Summer Olympics, giving a berth to the top three teams in the final standings. It was held in Sweden between 5 September and 14 September 2003. Sixteen national teams entered the event under the auspices of FIBA Europe, the sport's regional governing body. The cities of Borås, Luleå, Norrköping, Södertälje and Stockholm hosted the tournament. Lithuania won its third FIBA European title by defeating Spain with a 93–84 score in the final. Lithuania's Šarūnas Jasikevičius was voted the tournament's MVP.

Venues

Qualification

Format
The teams were split in four groups of four teams each where they played a round robin. The first team from each group qualified directly to the knockout stage. To define the other four teams that advanced to the knockout stage, second and third-placed teams from each group where cross-paired (2A vs. 3B, 3A vs. 2B, 2C vs. 3D, 3C vs. 2D) and the winner from each match advanced to the knockout stage.
In the knockout quarterfinals, the winners advanced to the semifinals. The winners from the semifinals competed for the championship in the final, while the losing teams play a consolation game for the third place.
The losing teams from the quarterfinals play in a separate bracket to define 5th through 8th place in the final standings.

Squads

At the start of tournament, all 16 participating countries had 12 players on their roster.

Preliminary round

Times given below are in Central European Summer Time (UTC+2).

Group A

|}

Group B

|}

Group C

|}

Group D

|}

Knockout stage

Championship bracket

Play-off

Quarterfinals

Semifinals

Third place

Final

5th to 8th place

Statistical Leaders

Individual Tournament Highs

Points

Rebounds

Assists

Steals

Blocks

Minutes

Individual Game Highs

Team Tournament Highs

Offensive PPG

Rebounds

Assists

Steals

Blocks

Team Game highs

Awards

Final standings

References

External links
 2003 European Championship for Men archive.FIBA.com

 
Qualification for the 2004 Summer Olympics
2003–04 in Swedish basketball
2003
International basketball competitions hosted by Sweden
September 2003 sports events in Europe
International sports competitions in Stockholm
Sports competitions in Södertälje
Sports competitions in Borås
Sports competitions in Luleå
Sports competitions in Norrköping
2000s in Stockholm
2003–04 in European basketball